Schuester is a surname. Notable people with the surname include:

 Will Schuester, a fictional character from the musical comedy-drama TV series Glee
 Terri Schuester

See also
 Schuster